Tanaka formula may refer to:
Tanaka equation, a kind of differential equation
Tanaka's formula, a kind of differential equation
Tanaka formula, a formula for determining maximum heart rate based on age